Loretto College School (a.k.a. Loretto College, or Loretto), formerly the Loretto Abbey Day School and Loretto Abbey Day School and College, is a Catholic high school for girls in Toronto, Ontario, Canada. It is operated by the Toronto Catholic District School Board, formerly the Metropolitan Separate School Board. The institution was founded by the Loretto Sisters (Institute of the Blessed Virgin Mary) in 1915, whose founder (Blessed Mary Ward) advocated for excellent education for young women so that they might "do great things". The name "college" refers to the school's association with Loretto College, a component of the University of St. Michael's College, part of the University of Toronto.

History 
Loretto College School was founded as a private school by the Sisters of the Institute of the Blessed Virgin Mary in 1915. The roots of the school go back to 1847 when the Loretto Sisters from Ireland opened a boarding and day school for young Catholic women in Toronto. However, the origins began in 1913 while the building was being erected, classes for the school began in a three-storey house with the commercial students from Bond Street moved to the "Casa" and the 538 music students moved the following year. The Loretto Day School opened in September 1915 on Brunswick Avenue with 200 girls, boarders, and day students from Grades 1 to 13 with a few boys from Grades 1 to 3. Afterwards, Casa became simply a resident for the sisters. In 1918, following the move to Brunswick from the old Abbey, the school became known as "Loretto Abbey Day School and College" before becoming "Loretto College School" even though the College component moved to St. George Street in 1937.

With the school population growing, Casa and Bains (acquired in 1947) were demolished in May 1953 and the modern three-storey high school was erected and opened in September 1954. Eventually, the Junior School was shuttered in June 1949, followed by the Boarding School in 1960 and the Secretarial Department in 1981. In 1967, the Sisters entered into an agreement with the Metropolitan Separate School Board to educate the school's Grade 9 and 10 students, while the Sisters retained control of Grades 11-13 classes. Beginning in 1985, following the provincial extension of high school funding for the final three grades of high school, Loretto College ceased to be a private school.

In 1986 LCS opened an annex on the former site of St. Dominic Savio Catholic School on Bathurst Street to accommodate overflow from the main campus.

On December 3, 1999, a fire broke out at the Brunswick building with 16 nuns escaping the blaze. The fire marked the end of an era of the Sisters living in the property. By 2001, the Loretto Sisters sold the Brunswick properties to a developer and the school was relocated on Markham Street in the former St. Peter Catholic School.

The school was relocated to a new building at 151 Rosemount Avenue, the former home of Richard W. Scott (Senior) Catholic School, in September 2005.  Originally, the site was shared by Bishop Francis Marrocco Catholic High School, that opened in 1986. The Brunswick building has since been converted into condominiums.

Student life
Loretto College uses a semester system. Students select a program of study from courses at the academic, applied, open and locally developed levels. In Grade 11 and 12, courses are selected based on the student's post-secondary choice of destination- university, college, apprenticeship, or the workplace.

Loretto's special education services are delivered through integrated programming in the mainstream classroom.

Spiritual life

As at all Catholic schools, students at Loretto College School take a religion course each year. The school's faith life also includes retreats, liturgies, charitable works and Catholic perspectives across the curriculum.
Mary Ward and the Loretto Sisters are role models.

Alumnae 
 Marilyn Bell, the first person to swim across Lake Ontario.
 Barbara Greene, former Member of Parliament and city councillor.
 O R Melling (G.V. Whelan), author.

Staff
Diane Vautour, a history teacher, was awarded the 2010 Governor General's Award for Excellence in Teaching Canadian History.

See also
List of high schools in Ontario

References

External links

Loretto Alumnae Association
Loretto Sisters (Canadian Region of the Institute of the Blessed Virgin Mary)

Toronto Catholic District School Board
High schools in Toronto
Catholic secondary schools in Ontario
Educational institutions established in 1915
Girls' schools in Canada
Sisters of Loreto schools
1915 establishments in Ontario